Brian Pederson (born May 6, 1981 in Sioux Falls, South Dakota) is an American soccer player who played for Rochester Thunder in the USL Premier Development League.

Career

College and Amateur
Pederson attended Roosevelt High School and played collegiate soccer at Salem International University in West Virginia where he was a three-year captain and was selected to the All-Conference and All-Region teams. He also spent the 2003 and 2004 seasons with the Sioux Falls Spitfire of the USL Premier Development League.

Professional
Pederson signed with the Minnesota Thunder of the USL First Division in 2007, and spent the next two seasons playing with the team, but only made one first team appearance, clocking just 18 minutes of field time.

In 2009 Pederson signed with Minnesota's development team, Rochester Thunder, in their inaugural campaign in the USL Premier Development League. Pederson scored the first goal in Rochester's franchise history on May 9, 2009, in a game against Des Moines Menace.

Personal
Pederson also was the assistant coach at Andover High School in Andover, Minnesota. He is also owner and operator of his own sports soccer company, A-game Soccer, LLC.

External links
 Minnesota Thunder Player Profile

References

1981 births
American soccer players
USL First Division players
USL League Two players
Living people
Minnesota Thunder players
Rochester Thunder players
Sioux Falls Spitfire players
Association football defenders